Pisanu Harnkhomtun (born 3 May 1986) is a member of the Thailand men's national volleyball team.

Career
Pisanu played with the club Khonkaen E-Sarn University in 2011. He won the 2010-11 Thailand League Best Middle Blocker award. He is a coach assistant with Air Force in 2017.

Clubs

As a volleyball player
  Nakhon Ratchasima (2010–2011)
  Khonkaen E-Sarn University (2011) 
  Nakhon Ratchasima (2013–2014)
  Chonburi E-Tech Air Force (2014–2016)
  Ratchaburi (2016–2017)
  Air Force (2019–present)

As a coach assistant
  Air Force (2017–2018)

Awards

Individual
 2010-11 Thailand League "Best Middle Blocker"

Clubs 
 2014 Thai–Denmark Super League -  Runner-up, with Nakhon Ratchasima
 2015 Thai–Denmark Super League -  Champion, with Chonburi
 2015–16 Thailand League -  3rd place, with Chonburi E-Tech Air Force
 2016–17 Thailand League -  Bronze Medal, with Ratchaburi
 2017–18 Thailand League -  Champion, with Air Force
 2019 Thai–Denmark Super League -  Runner-Up, with Air Force

References

1986 births
Living people
Pisanu Harnkhomtun
Pisanu Harnkhomtun
Volleyball players at the 2010 Asian Games
Pisanu Harnkhomtun
Southeast Asian Games medalists in volleyball
Competitors at the 2009 Southeast Asian Games
Pisanu Harnkhomtun
Pisanu Harnkhomtun